Qurti Kola (also Romanized as Qūrtī Kolā; also known as Qūrt Kolā) is a village in Miandorud-e Kuchak Rural District, in the Central District of Sari County, Mazandaran Province, Iran. At the 2006 census, its population was 736, in 208 families.

References 

Populated places in Sari County